Gata is a municipality located in the province of Cáceres, Extremadura, Spain. The Postal Code is 10860.

Villages
Gata
Moheda de Gata (La Mueda)

See also
Sierra de Gata, comarca

References

External links 

 Sitio web del Ayuntamiento de Villa de Gata
 Diputación de Cáceres - Ayuntamiento de Gata

Municipalities in the Province of Cáceres